Apalon is a village alongside the Zami River in Kyain Seikgyi Township, Kawkareik District, Karen State, south-eastern Myanmar. The areas around Apalon are mountainous and forested. It is located on the Death Railway.

Apalon (also: Camp 82 Kilo) was a Japanese prisoner of war work camp during World War II. The camp was initially used for the construction of a 50 metres steel bridge. It served as the headquarters of group 5. The first prisoners arrived in May 1943. From July 1944 onwards, it served as a repair shop for locomotives. The camp closed in August 1945.

Notes

Death Railway in Apalon
Weatherman.com in Apalon

External links
 "Apalon Map — Satellite Images of Apalon" Maplandia World Gazetteer

Populated places in Kayin State
Burma Railway